Marc-Antoine Gbarssin (born 11 December 1984) is a former professional footballer who plays as a defensive midfielder. Born in France, he made one appearance for the Central African Republic national team.

Club career

Royal Antwerp
Gbarssin was born in Bordeaux. In 2007, he signed a two-year contract with Royal Antwerp, with the option of an extra year. After two successful seasons with the Belgian club, he attracted the attention of several top-flight French and Belgian clubs. Italian club Bologna submitted a bid for Gbarssin, but Antwerp did not allow him to leave. This led to several off-field problems which meant that Gbarssin was left on the bench for the majority of the 2009–10 season.

Bologna
Gbarssin was released in the summer of 2010 and joined Bologna for the whole of pre-season. The club was subsequently acquired by new owners, who cancelled the contracts of all the players signed in the summer by the previous management.

FC Fredericia
Finding himself without a contract, Gbarssin signed a short-term deal with Danish club FC Fredericia in order to get some first-team football and maintain match fitness.

Carlisle United
On 31 December 2010, Gbarssin signed a one-month contract with Carlisle United. Carlisle manager Greg Abbott told the club website:

"Marco has done really well during the last three weeks and he's one we've managed to sneak under the radar. He's played to a good standard abroad and was recommended to me by a good friend of mine who told me he was worth a look. He's a really tough, solid but capable player who rarely gives the ball away. This month will show us whether he is capable of kicking on to the next level and if he manages that, he'll reward himself by earning a longer contract."

International clearance was received on 6 January 2011 and on 31 January Gbarssin signed a deal to stay at Carlisle until the end of the season.

In a surprise move, on 4 March 2011 Gbarssin joined Carlisle's League 1 rivals Walsall on a loan deal until the end of April.

Gbrassin was released by Carlisle United in May 2011.

International career
Gbarssin made his debut for the Central African Republic national team on 10 August 2011 in a friendly match against Malta, coming on as a 65th minute sub for Armel Kazangba.

References

External links
 Profile at Footgoal
 Profile at Antwerpsupporters

1984 births
Living people
Footballers from Bordeaux
Citizens of the Central African Republic through descent
Central African Republic footballers
Central African Republic international footballers
French footballers
French sportspeople of Central African Republic descent
Royal Antwerp F.C. players
Expatriate footballers in Belgium
Grenoble Foot 38 players
R.E. Virton players
Expatriate footballers in England
Carlisle United F.C. players
Walsall F.C. players
Expatriate men's footballers in Denmark
Expatriate footballers in Italy
Bologna F.C. 1909 players
S.C. Eendracht Aalst players
English Football League players
Association football midfielders
Central African Republic expatriate footballers
Central African Republic expatriate sportspeople in Italy
Central African Republic expatriate sportspeople in Belgium